Ophisaurus ceroni, Ceron's glass lizard, is a species of lizard of the Anguidae family. It is found in Mexico.

This species is known only from a small area of coastal dunes in central Veracruz state, near the city of Veracruz.

References

Ophisaurus
Reptiles described in 1965
Endemic reptiles of Mexico
Petén–Veracruz moist forests